James Ingalls may refer to:

 James Monroe Ingalls (1837–1927), American soldier and authority on ballistics
 James F. Ingalls, theatre lighting designer